For members of the Federal Parliament of Belgium (2007–2010), see:
List of members of the Chamber of Representatives of Belgium, 2007–2010
List of members of the Senate of Belgium, 2007–2010

Belgian Federal Parliament